John Nelson Partridge (1838 – April 8, 1920)  was the Police Commissioner for Brooklyn and Fire Commissioner for Brooklyn in the 1880s before the merger into New York City. He was the New York Superintendent of Public Works, and the New York City Police Commissioner from 1902 to 1903.

Biography
He was born in 1838 In Leicester, Massachusetts. From 1886 to 1887 he was president of the Brooklyn City and Newtown Railroad.

He was the New York City Police Commissioner from 1902 to 1903. During his tenure he wanted to move the New York City police headquarters from Mulberry Street to Times Square.

In 1906 he married Charlotte Held.

They then moved to Westport, Connecticut. He died on April 8, 1920 in Westport, Connecticut.

References

New York City Police Commissioners
1838 births
1920 deaths
People from Westport, Connecticut
People from Leicester, Massachusetts